Melvin "Mel" Richardson (April 29, 1928 – December 11, 2014) was an American radio broadcaster and politician.

Born in Salt Lake City, Utah, Richardson was a radio broadcaster and later was a television broadcaster. Richardson served as Mayor of Ammon, Idaho and was a Republican. In 1988, Richardson served in the Idaho House of Representatives and then he served in the Idaho State Senate from 1992 until 2008. Richardson died of cancer in Idaho Falls, Idaho.

References 

1928 births
2014 deaths
People from Bonneville County, Idaho
Politicians from Salt Lake City
Mayors of places in Idaho
Republican Party members of the Idaho House of Representatives
Republican Party Idaho state senators
American radio personalities
Deaths from cancer in Idaho